Tebenna galapagoensis is a moth in the family Choreutidae. It was described by John B. Heppner and Bernard Landry in 1994. It is found on the Galápagos Islands.

References

Natural History Museum Lepidoptera generic names catalog

Choreutidae
Moths described in 1994